Meranfjellet is a mountain in Sørkapp Land at Spitsbergen, Svalbard. It has a height of 491 m.a.s.l., and is the northern mountain of the ridge Påskefjella. The mountain is named after Austrian count Franz Meran.

References

Mountains of Spitsbergen